Chong Danni is a Chinese actress. She is known for her role in fantasy romance comedy series, Cinderella Chef.

Early life and education
Chong Danni was born in Shenyang, Liaoning Province. To pursue a singing career, she moved to Beijing and attended China Conservatory of Music Affiliated High School at age 15. After high school however, realizing her true passion is acting rather than singing folk music, she secretly and successfully applied to Beijing Film Academy against the wishes of her mother.
After completing her undergraduate studies at Beijing Film Academy in 2012, Danni pursued a master's degree from Beijing Film Academy on a full scholarship while also participating in many acting and singing projects.

Acting career 
During Danni second year at Beijing Film Academy, she was offered a major role in the television series Foster Father, produced by and co-starring Chinese entertainment mogul Zhang Guoli.
The series was a rating success, and Danni's performance in the series also garnered her wide critical acclaim, including a 2011 Sohu Best New Actress in Television nomination. Impressed by her potential as an actress, Zhang Guoli subsequently signed her to his talent agency.

Filmography

Film

Television series

Awards and nominations

References

External links 
 Chong Danni's Official Sina Blog

1989 births
Living people
Actresses from Shenyang
21st-century Chinese actresses
Chinese film actresses
Chinese television actresses